Johanna Westerdijk (4 January 1883 – 15 November 1961) was a Dutch plant pathologist and the first female professor in the Netherlands.

Early life
Johanna Westerdijk, called "Hans" by friends, was born on 4 January 1883 in Nieuwer-Amstel, a small village south of Amsterdam, and died on 15 November 1961 at 78 years old in Baarn, Netherlands.

Westerdijk came from a wealthy, intellectual, and artistic family of doctors Bernard Westerdijk (1853–1927) and Aleida Catharina Scheffer (1857–1931), the eldest child of three children. During her elementary school years, she always refused to take embroidery classes or play with dolls like most of the girls of her time. Instead, she enjoyed reading stories to other girls at her school. She mentioned to her teacher that she would make sure to earn enough money to have all her cleaning duties done for her.

Education 
She completed her secondary school at 17 years old and graduated from the Amsterdam school of girls. She was a gifted pianist and intended to become a professional pianist but a persistent neuritis in one arm made this impossible. Her interest in botany led her to attend Amsterdam University to follow the lectures of the famous botanist Hugo de Vries and work in his laboratory.

After finishing her biological studies in 1904 she decided to spend time in Munich and conduct research with mosses, and a year later she moved to Zurich where she studied moss regeneration, earning her PhD degree in 1906 under the supervision of Professor H. Schinz.

Career 

In 1906, at 23 years old, she was offered a directorship position at Willie Commelin Scholten, a phytopathological laboratory in the Netherlands. The laboratory under her supervision became an internationally respected institution of phytopathology, was moved from Amsterdam to the Villa Java in Baarn and is recognized to the present day with independent status as an institute of the Royal Netherlands Academy of Arts and Sciences.

While working as director of the phytopathological laboratory in 1908 she was in charge of keeping the International Association of Botanists collection of about 80 cultures of fungi. Under her supervision this collection expanded to over 10,000 strains of 6,000 different species of fungi, yeasts and actinomycetes. Named the Centraalbureau voor Schimmelcultures (Central Bureau of Fungal Cultures) the objective of this collection was and still is to keep a variety of fungi in cultures for distribution to research workers all over the world.  In 1913 she became the first female recipient of a grant from the Buitenzorg Fund (from the city of Buitenzorg, now called Bogor in Sundanese, in Indonesia), which she used to collect samples from a variety of diseased crops such as tobacco, sugar, coffee, tea, etc., and made cultures of the fungi for the collection.

Across her career she wrote over 60 publications in plant pathology and mycology.

Inspiration for women and students 

In 1917, she was appointed as the first female professor in the Netherlands, serving as associate professor of plant pathology in Utrecht University and in 1930 at the University of Amsterdam, with a total of 55 PhD students earning their degrees under her supervision in a period of 35 years. Almost half of them were women, being a source of inspiration for students interested in the history of women in science.

She wrote over 70 publications covering a broad spectrum of plant diseases and mycology, but her main interest was in pathogenic diseases of trees and physiological diseases of plants and how to control them. Several of her publications involved trials of chemicals for disease control.

Westerdijk was described by journalists as a young, natural, simple, and strong woman with a pleasant manner and a great sense of humor. She was also known by her close friends as loving to party, drink and dance and without an interest in marriage.

When she wanted to test the progress of her students, she would take them to a fancy bakery surrounded by fashionable ladies and suddenly ask them questions such as "OK, now what can you tell me about yellow disease or any other disease". She also had her own tradition at every new PhD ceremony, where a flag would be raised and three geese wearing white, red and blue bows around their necks would parade around the building. The doctor and his/her professor advisor would plant a tree in the one and a half hectare garden. This tradition became legendary.

All of the people who worked on their PhD in Baarn were inspired by the atmosphere and the influence of the laboratory's slogan "For fine minds, the art is to mix work and parties" which Johanna Westerdijk had carved in stone above the entrance to the room for practical work.

Westerdijk was active in the International Federation of University Women, now known as Graduate Women International. She served as the organization's president from 1932–1936.

Elm disease research 

In the 1920s, she was involved in understanding a new lethal vascular disease in elms (Dutch elm disease), raising money from different municipalities in the Netherlands, which she assigned to her first PhD student Marie Beatrice Schwarz.

Schwarz isolated and inoculated healthy elms, concluding that a fungus was killing the elms. Later J. Westerdijk assigned another student, Christine Johanna Buisman to confirm the finding from Schwarz that Ophiostoma ulmi was the cause of the disease. Buisman additionally bred elms for disease resistance, but unfortunately the elm that she developed was highly susceptible to another fungal disease caused by a Nectria sp.

Honors and awards 
 Member of the Royal Netherlands Academy of Arts and Sciences (1951)
 Fellow of the Linnean Society of London
 Officer of the Order of Orange-Nassau
 Order of the Netherlands Lion
 Knight of the Order of Saint James of the Sword (Portugal)
 Otto Appel Medal (1953) (established for outstanding plant pathologists) at Heidelberg 
 Honorary doctorate of the Uppsala University (1957)
 Honorary doctorate of the University of Giessen (1958)

Eponymous species
Several fungus species have been named in honour of Westerdijk, including:
Aspergillus westerdijkiae  
Helicodendron westerdijkiae  
Pestalotiopsis westerdykiae  
Gyrothyrium westerdijkiae   (now called Schizothyrium pomi)
Torulopsis westerdijkiae  
Westerdykella centenaria

Legacy
In 1907 Johanna Westerdijk became director of the CBS (Centraalbureau voor Schimmelcultures). In honour of Johanna Westerdijk's life and work, on 10 February 2017 the institute was renamed as the Westerdijk Fungal Biodiversity Institute.

References

External links 
 

1883 births
1961 deaths
20th-century Dutch women scientists
20th-century Dutch botanists
Dutch expatriates in England
Dutch expatriates in Germany
Dutch expatriates in Switzerland
Dutch mycologists
Dutch phytopathologists
Dutch women academics
Fellows of the Linnean Society of London
Knights of the Order of Saint James of the Sword
Knights of the Order of the Netherlands Lion
Ludwig Maximilian University of Munich alumni
Members of the Royal Netherlands Academy of Arts and Sciences
Officers of the Order of Orange-Nassau
People from Amstelveen
University of Amsterdam alumni
Academic staff of the University of Amsterdam
University of Zurich alumni
Academic staff of Utrecht University
Women mycologists
Women phytopathologists